Makuri is a farming community in Tararua District and Manawatū-Whanganui region of New Zealand's North Island.

The area features dusty gravel roads, a bush-clad gorge valley, and sheep farms on the rolling green surrounding hills. It is about an hour's drive from Palmerston North, between Pahiatua and Pongaroa.

A walking track has been established through the Makuri Gorge which takes about one hour to complete.

History

19th century

European settlers began farming the area in the late 19th century.

In 1889, Walter Tylee took control of 1200 acres of dense bush. The site was only accessible by a rough ten-mile horse track from Pahiatua, covered in two feet of mud during winter. By 1896 most of the property had been cleared for sheep farming. Tylee had been raised and educated in Napier and Nelson, and had travelled to Argentina to learn sheep farming.

In 1890, Frank Anderson purchased a 640-acre property covered in standing bush. By 1896, he had cleared 400 acres for farming sheep. Anderson was born in Wellington in 1870 and was educated at Wellington College and Wanganui College. He was active in establishing the local school and organising social functions.

In 1891, Bertram Harrison began managing the 3000 acre Tuscan Hills Estate. By 1896, 2000 acres had been felled, burnt and sown with grass to accommodate 3500 sheep and 100 cattle. The estate include an orchard and a villa, known as Bungalow House. Harrison had been born in Sydenham, England, in 1868, was educated in Berkhamstead, England, and had spent two years in Scotland and five years in New Zealand before taking over the estate. By 1897, he presided over the newly formed Makuri Cricket Club and was involved in local sports.

By 1897, the area was accessible by coach from Eketahuna railway station or Woodville railway station. The district had a daily mail service, and its nearest telegraph office was at Pahiatua.

20th century

A photograph of a farmhouse in Makuri, taken between 1923 and 1928 by Robert Percy Moore, depicts a panoramic view of a farmhouse by pine trees, above a river. There is still some native bush, and a driveway and bridge connecting the house with a main road. In the hills in the background, there are still remains of the farmer's attempts to clear the standing forest.

A New Zealand Railways Department collage poster, compiled about the same time, shows fly-fishing in Makuri as one of 12 examples of what makes New Zealand a "sportsman's paradise".

21st century

On 20 January 2014, a 6.2 magnitude earthquake struck the area, leaving a crack down the middle of Pahiatua-Pongaroa Road. It was the most powerful earthquake recorded in New Zealand that year.

In May 2018, a Landcorp's Rangedale Station, a 1380 hectare sheep and beef operation, was infected with Mycoplasma bovis.

Demography

There were 225 households. There were 324 males and 294 females, giving a sex ratio of 1.1 males per female. The median age was 37.7 years (compared with 37.4 years nationally), with 141 people (22.8%) aged under 15 years, 105 (17.0%) aged 15 to 29, 312 (50.5%) aged 30 to 64, and 57 (9.2%) aged 65 or older.

Ethnicities were 89.8% European/Pākehā, 11.7% Māori, 1.5% Pacific peoples, 4.9% Asian, and 2.4% other ethnicities (totals add to more than 100% since people could identify with multiple ethnicities).

The proportion of people born overseas was 9.2%, compared with 27.1% nationally.

Although some people objected to giving their religion, 51.9% had no religion, 35.0% were Christian, 0.5% were Hindu, 1.0% were Muslim and 3.4% had other religions.

Of those at least 15 years old, 57 (11.9%) people had a bachelor or higher degree, and 78 (16.4%) people had no formal qualifications. The median income was $33,800, compared with $31,800 nationally. The employment status of those at least 15 was that 261 (54.7%) people were employed full-time, 90 (18.9%) were part-time, and 15 (3.1%) were unemployed.

Economy

In 2018, 5.1% worked in manufacturing, 5.1% worked in construction, 0.9% worked in hospitality, 1.7% worked in transport, 6.0% worked in education, and 6.8% worked in healthcare.

Transportation

As of 2018, among those who commute to work, 45.3% drove a car and 4.3% rode in a car. No one ran, walked, cycled, or commuted by public transport.

Education

In 2009, a Ministry of Education review proposed closing eight of the ten schools in the Tararua bush area, including Makuri School. Makuri was the smallest of the schools at the time, having only six students. The principal said the closure would have been a "tragedy" for the Makuri community.

The school was investigated by the Office of the Auditor-General in 2017 for inappropriately borrowing money.

References

Populated places in Manawatū-Whanganui
Tararua District